The 1920 Cork hunger strike began on 11 August 1920, when 65 men interned without trial in Cork County Gaol went on hunger strike, demanding release from prison, and reinstatement of their status as political prisoners. The following day, they were joined by the Lord Mayor of Cork, Terence MacSwiney. A week into the hunger strike, all but 11 of the hunger strikers were released or deported to prison in England, with MacSwiney being among the latter. Michael Fitzgerald died after 68 days, while Joe Murphy died after 79 days. The nine surviving hunger strikers - Michael Burke, John Crowley, Peter Crowley, Seán Hennessy, Joseph Kenny, Thomas O'Donovan, Michael O'Reilly, John Power, and Christopher Upton - continued on for 94 days, ending their fast on 12 November 1920, following orders from Arthur Griffith.

The nine survivors of the 1920 Cork hunger strike hold the Guinness World Record for the longest hunger strike in history, in which no food was consumed, whether as a result of force-feeding or otherwise.

In October 1923 mass hunger strikes were undertaken by Irish republican prisoners protesting the continuation of their internment without trial (see 1923 Irish Hunger Strikes).

References

1920 in Ireland
Hunger strikes
Cork (city)